USS Skylark may refer to the following ships of the United States Navy:

On 28 April 1945, she struck a mine off Okinawa, and sank.
Fleet tug   was redesignated and renamed Skylark (ASR-20) on 7 November 1945. Decommissioned in June 1973, Skylark was sold to Brazil, in whose navy she served under the name Gastao Moutinho until about 1988.

United States Navy ship names